

Simon of Ghent (or Simon de Gandavo; died 1315) was a medieval Bishop of Salisbury in England.

Simon was a prebendary of the diocese of Salisbury and Chancellor of Oxford University, as well as Archdeacon of Oxford.

Simon was elected bishop on 2 June 1297 and consecrated on 20 October 1297 at Canterbury He died on 2 April 1315.

Citations

References
 British History Online Archdeacons of Oxford accessed on 30 October 2007
 British History Online Bishops of Salisbury accessed on 30 October 2007
 

Year of birth unknown
1315 deaths
Archdeacons of Oxford
Bishops of Salisbury
Chancellors of the University of Oxford
13th-century English Roman Catholic bishops
14th-century English Roman Catholic bishops